is a Japanese actor, singer, television host, and a former member of SMAP, one of the best-selling boy bands in Asia.

Early life
Kusanagi grew up in Kasukabe, Saitama, Japan.

Career

Music

In 1987, at age 13, Kusanagi auditioned to enter Johnny & Associates, a Japanese talent agency that recruits and trains young boys, preteens to teens, to become singers and members of boy bands. After five of the other band members auditioning individually from 1986 through 1987, in autumn 1987, twenty boys, from ages ten to seventeen, were put together into a group called The Skate Boys, which was initially created as backup dancers for a famous boy band, Hikaru Genji. In April 1988, producer Johnny Kitagawa chose six out of the twenty boys to create a new boy band and named them "SMAP".

A year after the dissolution of SMAP, Kusanagi, alongside former members Shingo Katori, and Goro Inagaki formed the group, Atarashii Chizu.

Acting
He had the lead role in the movie,  (January 18, 2003; a Japan public presentation). Moreover, his Korean-language-Japanese-produced movie  (March 6, 2004 Japan public presentation) was submitted to the Moscow International Film Festival on June 25, 2004.

In 2020, Kusanagi took on the role of Nagisa, a transgender nightclub worker in Eiji Uchida's Midnight Swan. The film won numerous awards, such as Picture of the Year, and he was subsequently awarded the Japan Academy Film Prize for Outstanding Performance by an Actor in a Leading Role.

Television
As a member of the boyband SMAP, Kusanagi used to co-host the weekly variety show SMAP×SMAP alongside his fellow bandmates for 20 years. In 2001, he hosted the variety show Chonangang on Fuji TV. Determined to debut in Korea, Kusanagi started learning the Korean language and appearing on Korean variety shows. This focus on Korean culture led to him adopting Chonangang as his Korean persona in various SMAP concerts, even releasing several singles. Originally, Chonangang was intended to focus on Kusanagi's journey in South Korea, however lasted eight years due to its popularity. Because of the show's success, the format shifted to feature interviews with popular Korean celebrities such as Lee Min-ho, and led to Kusanagi interviewing former South Korean Presidents Roh Moo-hyun, and Lee Myung-bak on TBS.

Personal life
Kusanagi announced his marriage on December 30, 2020.

Arrest
On April 23, 2009, at around 3 a.m., Kusanagi was arrested on suspicion of public indecency at Akasaka, Minato, Tokyo.
On April 24, 2009, he held a press conference accompanied by his attorney and apologized for his misbehavior. Prosecutors decided not to indict Kusanagi because of his apology. He took a one-month-long hiatus and returned to the taping of SMAPxSMAP on May 28, 2009.

Filmography

Film

Television (as actor)

Television (as personality)

Web program

Japanese dub

Radio

Theatre

Publications
 Kore ga Boku desu. (April 1997) 
 Okiraku (March 2007) 
 Kusanagiron (May 2008) 
 Okiraku 2 (March 2016) 
 Jeongmal Book (December 2002) 
 Jeongmal Book Hangul (December 2002) 
 Jeongmal Book 2 (November 2004) 
 Jeongmal Book 2.5 (November 2004) 
 Tsuki no Machi Yama no Machi (February 2011) 
 Document Kusanagi Tsuyoshi in Yomigaeri (2003) 
 The Hotel Venus Starring Kusanagi Tsuyoshi (2004) 
 Nippon Chinbotsu Photo Book featuring Kusanagi Tsuyoshi (2006) 
 Yama no Anata Tokushi no Koi (2008)

References

External links
 

1974 births
Living people
SMAP members
Japanese idols
People from Seiyo, Ehime
Japanese television personalities
Actors from Ehime Prefecture
Actors from Saitama Prefecture
Japanese male film actors
Japanese male pop singers
Japanese male stage actors
Japanese male television actors
Japanese male voice actors
Musicians from Ehime Prefecture
Musicians from Saitama Prefecture
20th-century Japanese male actors
20th-century Japanese male singers
20th-century Japanese singers
21st-century Japanese male actors
21st-century Japanese male singers
21st-century Japanese singers
Horikoshi High School alumni
Japanese YouTubers